Vilassar may refer to two places in the Province of Barcelona, Catalonia, Spain:

Vilassar de Dalt, Maresme
Vilassar de Mar, Maresme